Antena 1 is a Romanian free-to-air television network owned by the Antena TV Group, part of the Intact Media Group. Its programming consists of television news programs, soap opera shows, football matches, entertainment programmes, movies and television series.

Antena 1's headquarters was seized by the Romanian state on 8 August 2014, due to a judicial sentence against Dan Voiculescu, the founder of Intact Media Group. The building may be sold in order for the state to recuperate the loss brought to it as a result of the fraudulent privatization of the Institute for Alimentary Research in 2003. After company employees destroyed the interior of the building whilst moving out, the building required refurbishment before being placed on sale. The National Agency for the Management of Seized Assets (ANABI) has placed the building for sale on its website.

Current Programs
The station's top-rated local productions include entertainment shows, news programs and TV series.

News
Observator
Observator is the channel's daily newscast (that airs at the Observator 12 from Monday to Friday) it is one of the most watched newscasts in Romania. It has fifth daily editions, starting at 6.00 AM, 12.00 PM on weekdays or 1 PM on weekend, 5.00 PM, 7.00 PM, and 11.00 PM/11.30 PM. Its flagship daily evening newscast is Observator 19.00, anchored by Alessandra Stoicescu on weekdays, and Irina Ursu on weekend.

The daily morning edition of Observator is broadcast at 6.00 AM. Its hosts are Iuliana Pepene and Bogdan Alecsandru on weekdays, Mihai Jurca and Andra Petrescu on weekend are the hosts for Observator 6.00 AM. Laura Nuredin is hosted for Observator 13.00. From Monday to Friday, Andreea Ţopan, Olivia Păunescu and Valentin Butnaru are the hosts for Observator 12.00, Florin Căruceru and Mihaela Călin are anchoring the broadcast at 17:00. Also, from Monday to Thursday, Observator has a nightly news edition, hosted by Marius Pancu.

On November 28, 2016, when Antena 1 launched its own HD feed, Observator debuted a new set, which includes a new studio, a new logo, opening theme and a new graphics package. The Observator website, observator.tv, was also relaunched at the end of November 2016. On April 19, 2020, Observator came with a new graphics package and its website changed its name and domain to observatornews.ro, launching also a news application.

Original TV Series

Entertainment

Variety shows

Past Programs
 2k1, host Mirela Boureanu-Vaida
Aici eu sunt vedeta, host Dan Bittman
Adela, was a Romanian television drama
Acces Direct, hosts Mirela Vaida and Adrian Velea - now aired on Antena Stars
 Băieți de oraș, sitcom starring Mihai Bendeac and Vlad Drăgulin
Burlacul, was a Romanian reality television show and the Romanian version of The Bachelor, host Cătălin Botezatu
 Burlăcița, was a Romanian reality television show and the Romanian version of The Bachelorette, host Cătălin Botezatu
 Câștigi în 60 de secunde, host Dan Negru
 Comanda la mine!
 Danseaza Printre Stele, was a Romanian show and one of the Romanian versions of Dancing with the Stars
 Din Dragoste, host Mircea Radu
 FamiliaDA, (Family Olympics) was one of the Romanian versions of Family Feud, host Cosmin Seleși.
 FANtastic Show, host Florin Ristei
Gashka Mare, was a Romanian television summer show, host Pepe
 Ghicește vârsta (Guess my age), host Dan Negru
 Ham talent, was a Romanian television talent show for pets, host Liviu Vârciu
 IE, Românie, host Mircea Radu
 Iadul Bucatarilor, was a Romanian television cooking competition,  based on the Hell's Kitchen, host Virgil Mănescu.
În gura presei, host Mircea Badea - now aired on Antena 3
, was a Romanian television comedy show, host Mihai Bendeac
Liber ca pasărea cerului, was a Romanian television comedy
Mangalița, starring eXtra Factor'''s Ilona Brezoianu
 Marele câștigător, was a Romanian reality game show and the Romanian version of The Biggest Loser. The show features obese people competing to win a cash prize by losing the highest percentage of weight relative to their initial weight.
 Mireasă pentru fiul meu, was a matrimonial reality show. The competition was hosted by Mirela Boureanu-Vaida and was similar with Noră pentru mama'' who was aired on Kanal D Romania and whose continuation was, in fact Mireasă pentru fiul meu.
Mireasa - Măștile iubirii, was a Romanian matrimonial reality show, host Gabriela Cristea
Nuntǎ cu scântei, was a matrimonial reality show, host Ana Morodan
Nu te supăra frate, was a Romanian entertainment, hosts Pepe and Robert Tudor
Observator Special, was a Romanian monden news, host Octavia Geamănu
 Plasa de stele, was a Romanian television pranks show, host Dan Negru
Poftiți în vacanțǎ, host Marin Barbu
Prietenii de la 11, was a Romanian television entertainment hosts Florin Ristei and Diana Munteanu
 România Dansează, was a Romanian television dancing competition, host Jorge
 Să te prezint părinților
 Șerifi de România, host Dan Negru
 Splash! Vedete la apă, was a Romanian television diving competition between TV stars, hosts Pepe, Roxana Ionescu, Bianca Drăgușanu, Alina Pușcaș, Diana Munteanu
 Sport 20/de seară
 Superbingo Metropolis, host Cornel Palade, Romică Țociu, Raluca Lăzăruț and Escu
Sacrificiul, was a Romanian television drama
 , host Dan Negru
 Totul e permis, host Cosmin Seleși
Zaza Sing, was a Romanian television karaoke, competition, host Liviu Vârciu

References

External links
 Antena 1
 Observator

Television channels and stations established in 1993
Television stations in Romania